The Pruitt Twins were American identical twin brothers, who provided both guitar and banjo accompaniment on a number of blues recordings made in the 1920s. Both musicians were proficient in playing either instrument.  

According to researchers Bob Eagle and Eric S. LeBlanc, they were Millus David Pruett  and Myles Pennington Pruett, who were both born on April 19, 1894, in Bentonville, Arkansas, and grew up in Kansas City, Missouri.  Myles Pruett, at least, lived in Minneapolis in 1917 before returning to Kansas City, and by 1930 both brothers were living in Oklahoma City. Myles Pruett was married and living in Kansas City in 1933, and was in the same city in 1940.

AllMusic noted in relation to Myles Pruitt that his "... solid guitar work accompanied Kimbrough throughout her career and provided an excellent complement to her vocal style". On Kimbrough's first recording made in March 1924 in Chicago, Illinois, the pair got equal billing on the record label with Kimbrough (who was known as Lottie Beaman at that time); their surname was spelled as Pruett.  According to Frank Driggs and Chuck Haddix in their history of Kansas City jazz, "Myles's steady rhythm guitar and Millus's banjo frills embellish Beaman's otherwise plain vocal delivery. Dazzled by the twins' virtuosity, the producer for Paramount pressed them into service for two additional sessions accompanying Ida Cox and Ma Rainey."

The twins supplied accompaniment on four tracks recorded by Ma Rainey in 1924. When "Lost Wandering Blues" and "Dream Blues" were issued on a 10-inch shellac disc 78rpm single, the record label featured a picture of Rainey, which Paramount claimed was the first time that an image of an artist had appeared on a record label. The label also stated that Rainey was "with two guitar accompaniment by the Pruit Twins" , although most blues scholars agree it was played on a guitar and banjo.

They also worked with Ida Cox, providing musical support on two sides she recorded in 1924 for Paramount Records.  By 1928, when Lottie Kimbrough was recording for Gennett Records, Myles Pruitt alone, without the assistance of his twin, probably supplied the guitar backing. 

According to Social Security records, Millus David Pruett died on October 13, 1957, at the age of 63. No information is available on the death of his brother Myles.

Discography

§ = Probably, although detailed information was often lacking at that time
≠ - Re-recorded in 1929

References

1894 births
1957 deaths
American identical twins
Twin musical duos
American musical duos
Male musical duos
American blues guitarists
American banjoists
Musicians from Kansas City, Missouri
People from Bentonville, Arkansas
Paramount Records artists
Gennett Records artists